Dahira uljanae is a moth of the family Sphingidae which is endemic to China.

It is similar to Dahira taiwana but the forewings are longer. The forewing upperside has a pale grey area between the antemedian and postmedian bands and a pale grey wavy submarginal band running from the apex. The ground colour of the hindwing upperside is yellowish-orange with a brown marginal band.

References

uljanae
Moths described in 2006
Endemic fauna of China
Moths of Asia